The Greek Harehound (FCI No. 214) is a rare breed of dog that only comes in a black and tan color, originally bred as a scenthound for tracking and chasing hare in Southern Greece.

Appearance 
The Greek Harehound is a scenthound with a short-haired black and tan coat.

Head: The skull, which is relatively flat, is the same or slightly shorter than the muzzle's length. Its forehead is generally broad.
Jaws: The Greek Harehound has powerful jaws. Its teeth should either be in a scissor or pincer bite and evenly spaced.
Eyes: This breed possess bright brown-colored eyes that are medium-sized. The eyes should neither be set too deep or bulging.
Ears: The ears are set high, and should hang down halfway along the head.
Coat: The Greek Harehound has a short, dense coat that has a slightly hard texture. Its coat is usually only black and tan in color, yet a small white patch may be present in some individuals. No trimming or stripping is required.
Tail: The tail's length should not exceed the point of the hock. It is set high, thick at the base and tapering by a little at the tip.

Temperament 
The Greek Harehound has a lively, confident and outgoing temperament. These dogs are skilled, fearless hunters, and have a keen sense of smell as well as excellent strength and stamina. Their activity level is high and require regular physical stimulation and a large space to exercise. The Greek Harehound is also devoted to its owner, and generally makes a fine family pet, although they are better with older children. Since the Greek Harehound was originally bred to hunt in packs, it is placid with other dogs, yet they may be wary and suspicious around strangers.

Like other scenthound breeds, the Greek Harehound is independent and strong-willed at times. Males in particular require a confident owner to be in charge. These dogs can also be stubborn and impatient at times, so they should be trained at an early age. Positive reinforcements and proper discipline is necessary when training a Greek Harehound and rough handling should be avoided. Due to their original hunting purposes, the Greek Harehound is vocal and extremely loud, and may enjoy chasing small animals and moving things. They may also show destructiveness when bored or left alone for a prolonged period of time.

Overall speaking, these dogs can be challenging to train and are not recommended for the inexperienced dog owner as well as apartment life. They are more suitable as hunting dogs than house pets unless the owner is willing to exercise appropriately.

Health 
The Greek Harehound is a healthy breed with no known genetic defects. But like other dogs with pendulous ears, their ears are more prone to infections and need to be cleaned frequently. Their life span is around 11 years.

References 

Dog breeds originating in Greece
FCI breeds

Scent hounds
Rare dog breeds